The 2020 Arizona State Sun Devils baseball team represented Arizona State University in the 2020 NCAA Division I baseball season.  The Sun Devils played their home games at Phoenix Municipal Stadium, off campus in Phoenix, Arizona. It was Tracy Smith's sixth season as head coach.

Due to the COVID-19 pandemic, on March 30, 2020, the NCAA canceled the upcoming College World Series, but announced that senior spring athletes would have the opportunity to return to school for the 2021 spring season if they wished.

Personnel

Roster

Coaching Staff

Schedule and results

! style="" | Regular Season (13–4)
|- valign="top"

|- align="center" bgcolor=#ddffdd
|Feb. 14 || vs. Villanova || #5 || Phoenix Municipal Stadium • Phoenix, AZ || 4–1 || Levine || Kingsbury || Dabovich || ASU Live Stream || 2,311 || 1–0 || - 
|- align="center" bgcolor=#ffdddd
|Feb. 15 || vs. Villanova || #5 || Phoenix Municipal Stadium • Phoenix, AZ || 1–2 || Graceffo || Vander–Kooi ||  || ASU Live Stream ||  || 1–1 || - 
|- align="center" bgcolor=#ffdddd
|Feb. 15 || vs. #10 Michigan || #5 || Phoenix Municipal Stadium • Phoenix, AZ || 0–5 || Hajjar || Benson || White || ASU Live Stream || 4,740 || 1–2 || - 
|- align="center" bgcolor=#ddffdd
|Feb. 16 || vs. Villanova || #5 || Phoenix Municipal Stadium • Phoenix, AZ || 6–4 || Osman || Arella || Osman || ASU Live Stream || 2,399 || 2–2 || - 
|- align="center" bgcolor=#ffdddd
|Feb. 18 || vs. #28 Oklahoma State || #11 || Phoenix Municipal Stadium • Phoenix, AZ || 1–2 || Standlee || Tolman || Leeper || ASU Live Stream || 2,403 || 2–3 || - 
|- align="center" bgcolor=#ddffdd
|Feb. 21 || vs. Boston College || #11 || Phoenix Municipal Stadium • Phoenix, AZ || 10–4 || Vander–Kooi || Pelio ||  || ASU Live Stream || 2,509 || 3–3 || - 
|- align="center" bgcolor=#ddffdd
|Feb. 22 || vs. Boston College || #11 || Phoenix Municipal Stadium • Phoenix, AZ || 8–4 || Thornton || Mancini || Dabovich || ASU Live Stream ||  || 4–3 || - 
|- align="center" bgcolor=#ddffdd
|Feb. 23 || vs. Boston College || #11 || Phoenix Municipal Stadium • Phoenix, AZ || 8–4 || Dennie || Walsh ||  || ASU Live Stream ||  || 5–3 || - 
|- align="center" bgcolor=#ddffdd
|Feb. 25 || vs. New Mexico State || #12 || Phoenix Municipal Stadium • Phoenix, AZ || 6-5  ||  ||  ||  || ASU Live Stream  || || 6-3 ||  - 
|- align="center" bgcolor=#ddffdd
|Feb. 28 || vs. Nebraska || #12 || Phoenix Municipal Stadium • Phoenix, AZ || 13-5  ||  ||  ||  || ASU Live Stream ||  || 7-3  ||  - 
|- align="center" bgcolor=#ddffdd
|Feb. 29 || vs. Nebraska || #12 || Phoenix Municipal Stadium • Phoenix, AZ || 14-1 ||  ||  ||  || ASU Live Stream  ||  || 8-3 || - 
|-

|- align="center" bgcolor=ffdddd
|Mar. 1 || vs. Nebraska || #12 || Phoenix Municipal Stadium • Phoenix, AZ || 10-18  ||  ||  ||  ||ASU Live Stream  ||  || 8-4 || - 
|- align="center" bgcolor=ddffdd
|Mar. 3 || at. Cal State ||  || Goodwin Field • Fullerton, CA || 12-2 ||  ||  ||  ||Big West TV  ||  || 9-4 || - 
|- align="center" bgcolor=ddffdd
|Mar. 4 || at. Cal State ||  || Goodwin Field • Fullerton, CA || 9-3  ||  ||  ||  || Big West TV  ||  || 10-4 || - 
|- align="center" bgcolor=ddffdd
|Mar. 6 || vs. Fresno State ||  || Phoenix Municipal Stadium • Phoenix, AZ || 4-3 ||  ||  ||  || ASU Live Stream  ||  || 11-4 || - 
|- align="center" bgcolor=ddffdd
|Mar. 7 || vs. Fresno State ||  || Phoenix Municipal Stadium • Phoenix, AZ || 9-4 ||  ||  ||  || ASU Live Stream  ||  || 12-4  || - 
|- align="center" bgcolor=ddffdd
|Mar. 8 || vs. Fresno State ||  || Phoenix Municipal Stadium • Phoenix, AZ || 8-3  ||  ||  ||  || ASU Live Stream  ||  || 13-4  || - 
|- align="center" bgcolor=bbbbbb
|Mar. 10 || vs. Arizona || Canceled || Phoenix Municipal Stadium • Phoenix, AZ ||  ||  ||  ||  ||  ||  ||  || - 
|- align="center" bgcolor=bbbbbb
|Mar. 13 || vs. Utah || Canceled || Phoenix Municipal Stadium • Phoenix, AZ ||  ||  ||  ||  ||  ||  ||  || -
|- align="center" bgcolor=bbbbbb
|Mar. 14 || vs. Utah || Canceled || Phoenix Municipal Stadium • Phoenix, AZ ||  ||  ||  ||  ||  ||  ||  || -
|- align="center" bgcolor=bbbbbb
|Mar. 15 || vs. Utah || Canceled || Phoenix Municipal Stadium • Phoenix, AZ ||  ||  ||  ||  ||  ||  ||  || - 
|- align="center" bgcolor=bbbbbb
|Mar. 20 || at. Oregon State || Canceled || Goss Stadium at Coleman Field • Corvallis, OR ||  ||  ||  ||  ||  ||  ||  || - 
|- align="center" bgcolor=bbbbbb
|Mar. 21 || at. Oregon State || Canceled || Goss Stadium at Coleman Field • Corvallis, OR ||  ||  ||  ||  ||  ||  ||  || - 
|- align="center" bgcolor=bbbbbb
|Mar. 22 || at. Oregon State || Canceled || Goss Stadium at Coleman Field • Corvallis, OR ||  ||  ||  ||  ||  ||  ||  || - 
|- align="center" bgcolor=bbbbbb
|Mar. 27 || at. Stanford || Canceled || Klein Field at Sunken Diamond • Stanford, CA ||  ||  ||  ||  ||  ||  ||  || - 
|- align="center" bgcolor=bbbbbb
|Mar. 28 || at. Stanford || Canceled || Klein Field at Sunken Diamond • Stanford, CA ||  ||  ||  ||  ||  ||  ||  || - 
|- align="center" bgcolor=bbbbbb
|Mar. 29 || at. Stanford || Canceled || Klein Field at Sunken Diamond • Stanford, CA ||  ||  ||  ||  ||  ||  ||  || - 
|- align="center" bgcolor=bbbbbb
|Mar. 31 || at. Santa Clara || Canceled || Stephen Schott Stadium • Santa Clara, CA ||  ||  ||  ||  ||  ||  ||  || - 
|-

|- align="center" bgcolor=bbbbbb
|Apr. 3 || vs. Washington || Canceled || Phoenix Municipal Stadium • Phoenix, AZ ||  ||  ||  ||  ||  ||  ||  || - 
|- align="center" bgcolor=bbbbbb
|Apr. 4 || vs. Washington || Canceled || Phoenix Municipal Stadium • Phoenix, AZ ||  ||  ||  ||  ||  ||  ||  || -
|- align="center" bgcolor=bbbbbb
|Apr. 5 || vs. Washington || Canceled || Phoenix Municipal Stadium • Phoenix, AZ ||  ||  ||  ||  ||  ||  ||  || -
|- align="center" bgcolor=bbbbbb
|Apr. 7 || vs. Grand Canyon || Canceled || Phoenix Municipal Stadium • Phoenix, AZ ||  ||  ||  ||  ||  ||  ||  || -
|- align="center" bgcolor=bbbbbb
|Apr. 9 || vs. California || Canceled || Phoenix Municipal Stadium • Phoenix, AZ ||  ||  ||  ||  ||  ||  ||  || -
|- align="center" bgcolor=bbbbbb
|Apr. 10 || vs. California || Canceled || Phoenix Municipal Stadium • Phoenix, AZ ||  ||  ||  ||  ||  ||  ||  || -
|- align="center" bgcolor=bbbbbb
|Apr. 11 || vs. California || Canceled || Phoenix Municipal Stadium • Phoenix, AZ ||  ||  ||  ||  ||  ||  ||  || -
|- align="center" bgcolor=bbbbbb
|Apr. 15 || at. Long Beach State || Canceled || Blair Field • Long Beach, CA ||  ||  ||  ||  ||  ||  ||  || -
|- align="center" bgcolor=bbbbbb
|Apr. 17 || at. UCLA || Canceled || Jackie Robinson Stadium • Los Angeles, CA ||  ||  ||  ||  ||  ||  ||  || -
|- align="center" bgcolor=bbbbbb
|Apr. 18 || at. UCLA || Canceled || Jackie Robinson Stadium • Los Angeles, CA ||  ||  ||  ||  ||  ||  ||  || -
|- align="center" bgcolor=bbbbbb
|Apr. 19 || at. UCLA || Canceled || Jackie Robinson Stadium • Los Angeles, CA ||  ||  ||  ||  ||  ||  ||  || -
|- align="center" bgcolor=bbbbbb
|Apr. 21 || at. Grand Canyon || Canceled || Brazell Field at GCU Ballpark • Phoenix, AZ ||  ||  ||  ||  ||  ||  ||  || -
|- align="center" bgcolor=bbbbbb
|Apr. 24 || at. Arizona || Canceled || Hi Corbett Field • Tucson, AZ ||  ||  ||  ||  ||  ||  ||  || -
|- align="center" bgcolor=bbbbbb
|Apr. 25 || at. Arizona || Canceled || Hi Corbett Field • Tucson, AZ ||  ||  ||  ||  ||  ||  ||  || -
|- align="center" bgcolor=bbbbbb
|Apr. 26 || at. Arizona || Canceled || Hi Corbett Field • Tucson, AZ ||  ||  ||  ||  ||  ||  ||  || -
|- align="center" bgcolor=bbbbbb
|Apr. 28 || at. UNLV || Canceled || Earl Wilson Stadium • Paradise, NV ||  ||  ||  ||  ||  ||  ||  || -
|-

|- align="center" bgcolor=bbbbbb
|May. 1 || at. USC || Canceled || Phoenix Municipal Stadium • Phoenix, AZ ||  ||  ||  ||  ||  ||  ||  || -
|- align="center" bgcolor=bbbbbb
|May. 2 || at. USC || Canceled || Phoenix Municipal Stadium • Phoenix, AZ ||  ||  ||  ||  ||  ||  ||  || -
|- align="center" bgcolor=bbbbbb
|May. 3 || at. USC || Canceled || Phoenix Municipal Stadium • Phoenix, AZ ||  ||  ||  ||  ||  ||  ||  || -
|- align="center" bgcolor=bbbbbb
|May. 8 || vs. Washington State || Canceled || Bailey–Brayton Field • Pullman, WA ||  ||  ||  ||  ||  ||  ||  || -
|- align="center" bgcolor=bbbbbb
|May. 9 || vs. Washington State || Canceled || Bailey–Brayton Field • Pullman, WA ||  ||  ||  ||  ||  ||  ||  || -
|- align="center" bgcolor=bbbbbb
|May. 10 || vs. Washington State || Canceled || Bailey–Brayton Field • Pullman, WA ||  ||  ||  ||  ||  ||  ||  || -
|- align="center" bgcolor=bbbbbb
|May. 15 || at. Oregon || Canceled || Phoenix Municipal Stadium • Phoenix, AZ ||  ||  ||  ||  ||  ||  ||  || -
|- align="center" bgcolor=bbbbbb
|May. 16 || at. Oregon || Canceled || Phoenix Municipal Stadium • Phoenix, AZ ||  ||  ||  ||  ||  ||  ||  || -
|- align="center" bgcolor=bbbbbb
|May. 17 || at. Oregon || Canceled || Phoenix Municipal Stadium • Phoenix, AZ ||  ||  ||  ||  ||  ||  ||  || -
|- align="center" bgcolor=bbbbbb
|May. 21 || at. UC Riverside || Canceled || Phoenix Municipal Stadium • Phoenix, AZ ||  ||  ||  ||  ||  ||  ||  || -
|- align="center" bgcolor=bbbbbb
|May. 22 || at. UC Riverside || Canceled || Phoenix Municipal Stadium • Phoenix, AZ ||  ||  ||  ||  ||  ||  ||  || -
|- align="center" bgcolor=bbbbbb
|May. 23 || at. UC Riverside || Canceled || Phoenix Municipal Stadium • Phoenix, AZ ||  ||  ||  ||  ||  ||  ||  || -
|-

| Source:

Rankings

2020 MLB draft

References

Arizona State Sun Devils baseball seasons
Arizona State Sun Devils
Arizona State Sun Devils baseball